Angelika Sita Ouedraogo (born 4 December 1993 in Ouagadougou, Burkina Faso) is a Burkinabé swimmer. She competed in the 50 m freestyle event at the 2012 Summer Olympics where she ranked 63rd and did not advance to the semifinals.

Ouedraogo competed in the 50 m freestyle event at the 2016 Summer Olympics where she ranked 67th and did not advance to the semifinals. She was flag bearer for her country during the closing ceremony.

In 2019, she represented Burkina Faso at the 2019 World Aquatics Championships held in Gwangju, South Korea. She competed in the women's 50 metre freestyle event. She did not advance to compete in the semi-finals.

Ouedraogo competed in the 50 m Freestyle again at the 2020 Summer Olympics where she placed 58th overall and did not advance to the semifinals.

References 

1993 births
Living people
Burkinabé female swimmers
Burkinabé female freestyle swimmers
Swimmers at the 2010 Summer Youth Olympics
Olympic swimmers of Burkina Faso
Swimmers at the 2012 Summer Olympics
Swimmers at the 2016 Summer Olympics
Sportspeople from Ouagadougou
Burkinabé female modern penathletes
Swimmers at the 2019 African Games
African Games competitors for Burkina Faso
Swimmers at the 2020 Summer Olympics
21st-century Burkinabé people